Chanler is a surname. Notable people with the surname include:

Robert Winthrop Chanler (1872–1930), American artist.
Lewis Stuyvesant Chanler (1869–1942), New York lawyer
John Winthrop Chanler (1826–1877), New York lawyer and a U.S. Representative from New York
William A. Chanler (1867–1934), U.S. Representative from New York, son of John Winthrop Chanler
Beatrice Chanler (1881–1946), American actress, sculptor and Cleopatra's Daughter biographer
Theodore Ward Chanler (1902–1961), American composer
Julia Lynch Olin, American author and Bahá'í
Elizabeth Astor Winthrop Chanler, American heiress and socialite, daughter of John Winthrop Chanler. and wife of John Jay Chapman

See also
Chandler (surname)